The Fața is a left tributary of the river Timișana in Romania. It flows into the Timișana near Boldur, west of Lugoj.

References

Rivers of Romania
Rivers of Timiș County